Eriocrania sakhalinella is a moth of the family Eriocraniidae. It was described, in 1983 by Mikhail Vasilievich Kozlov, from a specimen found on Sakhalin Island, Russia. It is also found in Japan.

The larvae feed on Alnus hirusuta.

References

sakhalinella
Leaf miners
Moths described in 1983
Moths of Asia